Neimongosaurus (meaning "Nei Mongol lizard") is a genus of herbivorous therizinosaur theropod dinosaur that lived in Asia during the Cenomanian stage of the Late Cretaceous period in what is now the Iren Dabasu Formation.

Discovery and naming
Neimongosaurus is a therizinosauroid which is known from the holotype LH V0001, consisting of a partially preserved braincase; the front of the right lower jaw; a nearly complete axial column compromising 15 cervical (including the axis), 4 dorsal and 22 caudal vertebrae; a furcula; both scapulocoracoids; both humeri; left radius; fragmented ilia; both femora; both tibiae; left tarsals and a virtually complete and articulated left pes. A second specimen, LH V0008, consisting of a sacrum composed by 6 sacral vertebrae and both ilia, was assigned as the paratype. The specimens were collected in 1999 at Sanhangobi in Inner Mongolia from the Iren Dabasu Formation, dating from the Cenomanian stage.

Based on these remains, the type species, Neimongosaurus yangi, was formally named and described by Zhang Xiaohong, Xu Xing, Paul Sereno, Kwang Xuewen and Tan Lin in 2001. The generic name is derived from Nei Mongol, the Chinese name for Inner Mongolia. The specific name honours Yang Zhongjian.

Description

Neimongosaurus was a bipedal and ponderous animal with well developed hindlimbs. Its lower jaw is U-shaped, preserving only a partial right dentary. There are 5 alveoli in which only one tooth was preserved. It is coarsely serrated, indicating a herbivorous diet like other therizinosaurs, such as Alxasaurus or Erlikosaurus. It had a relatively elongated neck composed by approximately 16 cervicals (if preserved atlas). Overall, the forelimbs are well preserved, missing the manus. Its scapula had a tapering end.

Classification
The original describers of the genus assigned Neimongosaurus to the Therizinosauroidea, in a basal position. Subsequent cladistic analyses have indicated a position in the more derived Therizinosauridae, but an analysis in 2010 by Lindsay Zanno recovered the original placement. However, Hartman et al. 2019 recovered Neimongosaurus as a therizinosaurid again. Below are the results:

Paleobiology
In a 2006 conference abstract, Sara Burch presented the inferred range of motion in the arms of the therizinosaur Neimongosaurus and concluded the overall motion at the glenoid-humeral joint at the shoulder was roughly circular, and directed sideways and slightly downwards, which diverged from the more oval, backwards-and-downwards-directed ranges of other theropods. This ability to extend their arms considerably forwards may have helped Neimongosaurus reach and grasp for foliage.

See also

 Timeline of therizinosaur research

References

Late Cretaceous dinosaurs of Asia
Fossil taxa described in 2001
Therizinosaurs
Taxa named by Paul Sereno